Steven Richard Nicosia (born August 6, 1955) is an American former professional baseball player. He played in Major League Baseball as a catcher from  through  for the Pittsburgh Pirates, San Francisco Giants, Montreal Expos and Toronto Blue Jays. The 1973 first round draft pick was a member of the  world champion Pittsburgh Pirates team. Listed at 5' 10" and weighing 185 lb., Nicosia batted and threw right-handed.

Major League Baseball career
Nicosia was born in Paterson, New Jersey. He was a first round draft pick of the Pittsburgh Pirates out of North Miami Beach High School in 1973. At the age of only twenty-two, Nicosia made his major league debut for the Pirates on July 8, 1978. In the following season, Nicosia was primarily a platoon catcher (he started 52 out 58 regular-season games against left-handed starting pitchers, but only 3 games against right-handed starters) and he was called on to start at catcher for four of the seven games in the 1979 World Series against the lefty-heavy starting rotation of the Baltimore Orioles. Nicosia was behind the plate for the Pirates World Series winning Game Seven victory over the Orioles. During highlights of Game Seven of the 1979 World Series, Nicosia can be seen delivering several punches to a fan who tried to take his catcher's mask following the conclusion of the game. The fan was one of hundreds who had invaded the playing surface of Baltimore's Memorial Stadium trying to secure souvenirs of the victory.

References

External links

Pura Pelota (Venezuelan Winter League)

1955 births
Living people
American expatriate baseball players in Canada
Baseball players from Paterson, New Jersey
Charleston Charlies players
Charleston Pirates players
Columbus Clippers players
Major League Baseball catchers
Montreal Expos players
Navegantes del Magallanes players
American expatriate baseball players in Venezuela
People from North Miami Beach, Florida
Pittsburgh Pirates players
Salem Pirates players
San Francisco Giants players
Sherbrooke Pirates players
Shreveport Captains players
Toronto Blue Jays players